The switched reluctance motor (SRM) is an electric motor that runs by reluctance torque. Unlike common brushed DC motor types, power is delivered to windings in the stator (case) rather than the rotor. This greatly simplifies mechanical design as power does not have to be delivered to a moving part which eliminates the need for a commutator, but it complicates the electrical design as some sort of switching system needs to be used to deliver power to the different windings. Electronic devices can precisely time the switching of currents, facilitating SRM configurations. Its main drawback is torque ripple. Controller technology that limits torque ripple at low speeds has been demonstrated. Sources disagree on whether it is a type of stepper motor.

The same electromechanical design can be used in a generator. The load is switched to the coils in sequence to synchronize the current flow with the rotation. Such generators can be run at much higher speeds than conventional types as the armature can be made as one piece of magnetisable material, as a slotted cylinder. In this case the abbreviation SRM is extended to mean Switched Reluctance Machine, (along with SRG, Switched Reluctance Generator). A topology that is both motor and generator is useful for starting the prime mover, as it saves a dedicated starter motor.

History

The first patent was by W. H. Taylor in 1838  in the United States.

The principles for SR drives were described around 1970, and enhanced by Peter Lawrenson and others from 1980 onwards. At the time, some experts viewed the technology as unfeasible, and practical application has been limited, partly because of control issues and unsuitable applications, and because low production numbers result in higher cost.

Operating principle
The SRM has wound field coils as in a DC motor for the stator windings. The rotor however has no magnets or coils attached. It is a solid salient-pole rotor (having projecting magnetic poles) made of soft magnetic material (often laminated steel). When power is applied to the stator windings, the rotor's magnetic reluctance creates a force that attempts to align the rotor pole with the nearest stator pole. In order to maintain rotation, an electronic control system switches on the windings of successive stator poles in sequence so that the magnetic field of the stator "leads" the rotor pole, pulling it forward. Rather than using a mechanical commutator to switch the winding current as in traditional motors, the switched-reluctance motor uses an electronic position sensor to determine the angle of the rotor shaft and solid state electronics to switch the stator windings, which enables dynamic control of pulse timing and shaping. This differs from the apparently similar induction motor that also energizes windings in a rotating phased sequence. In an SRM the rotor magnetization is static (a salient 'North' pole remains so as the motor rotates) while an induction motor has slip (rotates at slightly less than synchronous speed). SRM's absence of slip makes it possible to know the rotor position exactly, allowing the motor to be stepped arbitrarily slowly.

Simple switching
If the poles A0 and A1 are energised then the rotor will align itself with these poles. Once this has occurred it is possible for the stator poles to be de-energised before the stator poles of B0 and B1 are energized. The rotor is now positioned at the stator poles b. This sequence continues through c before arriving back at the start. This sequence can also be reversed to achieve motion in the opposite direction. High loads and/or high de/acceleration can destabilize this sequence, causing a step to be missed, such that the rotor jumps to wrong angle, perhaps going back one step instead of forward three.

Quadrature
A much more stable system can be found by using a "quadrature" sequence in which two coils are energised at any time. First, stator poles A0 and A1 are energized. Then stator poles B0 and B1 are energized which, pulls the rotor so that it is aligned in between A and B. Following this A's stator poles are de-energized and the rotor continues on to be aligned with B. The sequence continues through BC, C and CA to complete a full rotation. This sequence can be reversed to achieve motion in the opposite direction. More steps between positions with identical magnetisation, so the onset of missed steps occurs at higher speeds or loads.

In addition to more stable operation, this approach leads to a duty cycle of each phase of 1/2, rather than 1/3 as in the simpler sequence.

Control
The control system is responsible for giving the required sequential pulses to the power circuitry. It is possible to do this using electro-mechanical means such as commutators or analog or digital timing circuits.

Many controllers incorporate programmable logic controllers (PLCs) rather than electromechanical components. A microcontroller can enable precise phase activation timing. It also enables a soft start function in software form, in order to reduce the amount of required hardware. A feedback loop enhances the control system.

Power circuitry

The most common approach to powering an SRM is to use an asymmetric bridge converter. The switching frequency can be 10 times lower than for AC motors.

The phases in an asymmetric bridge converter correspond to the motor phases. If both of the power switches on either side of the phase are turned on, then that corresponding phase is actuated. Once the current has risen above the set value, the switch turns off. The energy now stored within the winding maintains the current in the same direction, the so-called back EMF (BEMF). This BEMF is fed back through the diodes to the capacitor for re-use, thus improving efficiency.

This basic circuitry may be altered so that fewer components are required although the circuit performs the same action. This efficient circuit is known as the (n+1) switch and diode configuration.

A capacitor, in either configuration, is used for storing BEMF for re-use and to suppress electrical and acoustic noise by limiting fluctuations in the supply voltage.

If a phase is disconnected, an SR motor may continue to operate at lower torque, unlike an AC induction motor which turns off.

Applications 
SRMs are used in some appliances.

References

External links

 Switched Reluctance Motor Drives
 Real-Time Simulation and Control of Reluctance Motor Drives for High Speed Operation with Reduced Torque Ripple
 Torrey - Switched reluctance generators and their control DOI: 10.1109/41.982243
 Asadi - Development and application of an advanced switched reluctance generator drive
 SR database archive
  Adam Biernat: Electrical Machines in the Power Engineering and Automatics (Warsaw Polytechnic)
 Synchronous Reluctance Motor Introduction Concepts

Electric motors